Galeomma is a genus of African flowering plants in the family Asteraceae.

 Species
 Galeomma oculus-cati (L.f.) Rauschert - Cape Provinces
 Galeomma stenolepis (S.Moore) Hilliard - Cape Provinces, Botswana, Namibia

References

Gnaphalieae
Asteraceae genera
Flora of Southern Africa